Emilia Annis I. Jones (born 23 February 2002) is an English actress. She played the lead role of Ruby Rossi in the Academy Award-winning 2021 film CODA. She has received several accolades, including a Screen Actors Guild Award and a nomination for a BAFTA Award for Best Actress.

She is also known for playing Kinsey Locke in the Netflix series Locke & Key (2020–2022), and has appeared in shows like Doctor Who (2013) and Utopia (2013–2014). Her other lead film roles include Brimstone (2016), Ghostland & Two for Joy (both in 2018), and Horrible Histories (2019). She has also performed in several theatrical productions in London's West End.

Early life
Jones was born in London to Welsh singer and presenter Aled Jones and his English wife, circus performer Claire Fossett. She grew up in Barnes with her younger brother Luke. She attended an improv class run by an agent, through whom Jones was cast in One Day.

Career
Jones' acting career began in 2010, at the age of eight, when she appeared as Jasmine in the film One Day. She portrayed Alice in the Channel 4 drama Utopia, and later that year played the young Queen of Years Merry Gejelh in the British television series Doctor Who episode "The Rings of Akhaten" (2013). The Boston Standard lauded her for "carr[ying] off her scenes with aplomb" and for "really sell[ing] Merry’s mixture of naivety, knowledge and childlike fear," while the website Zap2It praised Jones' performance as "spot on." She had a small role in Pirates of the Caribbean: On Stranger Tides (2011).

In 2011, Jones made her theatrical debut playing the princess Young Fiona in the original production of Shrek the Musical at the Theatre Royal, Drury Lane. In 2013, she appeared in Rebecca Lenkiewicz's stage adaptation of Henry James's The Turn of the Screw as nine-year-old Flora, alternating between two other girls each night. After her performance on press night, she said, "I don’t find it scary, I just find it so much fun... I love every bit of it."

In December 2018, it was announced that Jones was cast as Kinsey Locke, one of the main characters in the Netflix fantasy drama series Locke & Key (2020–2022). The first season was released on 7 February 2020. It was her first main role in a television series. She was attracted to the part because of the prospect of playing two versions of the same character: Kinsey before and after she removes her fear. 
 
In 2021, Jones starred in the Apple TV+ comedy-drama film CODA as Ruby Rossi, the only hearing member of her family who dreams of going to Berklee. For the part, she spent nine months (during production of Locke & Key) learning American Sign Language, while also learning how to operate a professional fishing trawler. Principal photography ran from September 2019 to January 2020. The film premiered on 28 January 2021 at the Sundance Film Festival, where it was bought by Apple Original Films for $25 million. It premiered on Apple TV+ on 13 August 2021 and received positive reviews; Jones and co-star Troy Kotsur were critically acclaimed and received several accolades. The film won the award for Best Picture at the 94th Academy Awards, the first Sundance-premiered film to do so.

Jones' upcoming films are Cat Person and Winner, both directed by Susanna Fogel, and Fairyland directed by Andrew Durham in his directorial debut.

Filmography

Film

Television

Music videos

Discography

Soundtracks

As main artist

As featured artist

As songwriter

Theatre

Awards and nominations

References

External links

Living people
2002 births
English child actresses
21st-century English actresses
Actresses from London
English people of Welsh descent
English television actresses
English film actresses
English singer-songwriters
English stage actresses
Outstanding Performance by a Cast in a Motion Picture Screen Actors Guild Award winners
People from Barnes, London